CCTV-10 is the science and education focused channel of the China Central Television (CCTV) network in the People's Republic of China. Its schedule includes mostly local and imported documentaries, as well as educational studio productions.

Programmes 
 Lecture Room [百家讲坛]
 Great Masters [大家]
 Reading [读书, lit. Reading Books]
 The Doctor is In [健康之路, lit. The Way to Health]
 People [人物]
 Yingshi Mingtang [影视名堂]
 Just So [原来如此]
 Approaching Science [走近科学]

See also 
 CCTV channels

References

External links 
  

China Central Television channels
Television channels and stations established in 2001
2001 establishments in China